Eli Carter (born June 6, 1991) is an American professional basketball player who last played for Amal Essaouira of the Nationale 1. After two years at Rutgers University and two years at Florida and one year at Boston College Carter entered the 2016 NBA draft but was not selected in the draft's two rounds.

High school career
Carter played high school basketball at Brewster Academy in Wolfeboro, New Hampshire. He was ranked as the nation's 114th overall prospect and No. 32 shooting guard by Rivals.com and ranked the country's No. 31 point guard recruit by Scout.com.

College career

Rutgers
A 6'2" point guard, Carter began his college career at Rutgers University. He appeared in 56 games and made 46 starts in his first two collegiate seasons. Carter also led the team in scoring both seasons, averaging 13.8 as a freshman and 14.9 as a sophomore before he fractured his fibula.

Florida
In 2013, Carter was transferred to the University of Florida and played for the Florida Gators. Carter appeared in 35 games in two seasons and made 17 starts. He only appeared in seven games in 2013–14 and received a medical redshirt to rehab a leg injury he sustained the previous season at Rutgers. As a senior, he made all 17 starts as and in 24.5 minutes, he averaged 8.8 points, 2.0 rebounds and 1.6 assists per game.

Professional career
After going undrafted at the 2016 NBA draft Carter began his pro career in the 2016–17 season in Greece, with Promitheas Patras. On October 4, he left the team after he was replaced by Rashad Anderson. He played with Promitheas in the Greek Cup competition, before being released by them. On September 23, 2016, Carter signed with Doxa Lefkadas of the Greek Basket League.

References

External links
NBAdraft.com Profile
RealGM.com Profile
Espn.com Profile

1991 births
Living people
Basketball players from New Jersey
Boston College Eagles men's basketball players
Doxa Lefkadas B.C. players
Florida Gators men's basketball players
People from Willingboro Township, New Jersey
Point guards
Promitheas Patras B.C. players
Rutgers Scarlet Knights men's basketball players
Shooting guards
Sportspeople from Burlington County, New Jersey
American men's basketball players